Spring Hill High School is a secondary school in unincorporated Hempstead County, Arkansas, United States, with a Hope postal address but outside of the Hope city limits. The school serves students in grades 7 through 12. It is one of four high schools in Hempstead County. It is the sole high school in the Spring Hill School District.

Academics 
The assumed course of study follows the Smart Core curriculum developed by the Arkansas Department of Education (ADE), which requires students to complete at least 22 units to graduate. Students complete regular courses and exams and may self-select Advanced Placement (AP) coursework and exams with the opportunity for college credit. The school is accredited by the ADE.

In 2012, the U.S. News & World Report Best High Schools ranking report ranked Spring Hill as the No. 13 school in the state and No. 1,669 in the nation. The school is accredited by AdvancED since 1964.

Extracurricular activities 
The Spring Hill High School mascot is the Bear with blue and gold serving as its school colors.  For 2012-14, the Spring Hill Bears compete in the 2A Region 7 Conference under the administration of the Arkansas Activities Association (AAA). Interscholastic activities include basketball (boys/girls), baseball, cheer, football, golf (boys/girls), softball, and track (boys/girls).

References

External links 
 

Public high schools in Arkansas
Schools in Hempstead County, Arkansas